In Mandaeism, the taga is a white crown traditionally made of silk that is used during Mandaean religious rituals. The taga is a white crown which always takes on masculine symbolism, while the klila (myrtle wreath) is a feminine symbol that complements the taga.

Use in rituals
Along with the klila, the taga is used during most Mandaean rituals, including masbuta, masiqta, and priest initiation rituals.

In the Qolasta

Several prayers in the Qolasta are recited when consecrating and putting on the taga.

See also
Drabsha
Klila
Rasta (Mandaeism)

References

Mandaean religious objects
Symbols of Abrahamic religions
Mandaic words and phrases
Crowns (headgear)